These are the results of the women's vault competition, one of six events for female competitors of the artistic gymnastics discipline contested in the gymnastics at the 2004 Summer Olympics in Athens. The qualification and final rounds took place on August 15 and August 22 at the Olympic Indoor Hall.

The medals for the competition were presented by Bruno Grandi, Italy; IOC Member, and the medalists' bouquets were presented by Jackie Fie, United States; President of the Women's Technical Committee of the FIG.

Results

Qualification

Eighty-four gymnasts competed in the vault event in the artistic gymnastics qualification round on August 15.
The eight highest scoring gymnasts advanced to the final on August 22.

Final

**Coralie Chacon gave up her second vault because she got hurt after the first vault, which was a Double-Twisting Tsukahara (Zamolodchikova).

References
Gymnastics Results.com

Women's vault
2004
2004 in women's gymnastics
Women's events at the 2004 Summer Olympics